"Gucci Gang" is a song by American rapper Lil Pump. It is produced by Bighead and co-produced by Gnealz, and is the fifth single from Lil Pump's debut album,  Lil Pump. It was originally released on Pump's SoundCloud account on August 28, 2017, and was later made available for digital download and streaming by Tha Lights Global and Warner Bros. Records on August 30, 2017. It is Lil Pump's highest-charting single to date on the US Billboard Hot 100, peaking at number three. It has been certified five-times platinum by the Recording Industry Association of America.

Production
In a November 2017 interview with Complex, producer Bighead spoke of his inspiration from Blink-182, whom he considers to have reached the Billboard charts with simple compositions: "Simple music is good music, because if a three-year-old or a four-year-old can sing it, that's what I aim for. Like 'Gucci Gang'—a little kid can sing that."

Music and lyrics 
Gnealz and Bighead provide Pump with "booming drums and a hazy piano melody".

Music video
On October 21, 2017, Lil Pump posted a 44-second snippet of the music video for "Gucci Gang" on his Twitter page, In which he told his fans to "retweet it if I should drop it right now". He released the video three days later on his YouTube channel on October 23, 2017. , the video has had 1.156 billion views on YouTube.

The video was directed by Ben Griffin of Prime Zero Productions, who was approached by Warner Bros. to direct this video and the one for Lil Pump's 2018 single "Esskeetit". Lil Pump's brief was that the video should include a tiger, a school and a food fight. According to Griffin, the tiger is a media-trained specimen who walked through the corridor alongside Lil Pump, with no computer-generated imagery involved.

The video was filmed at the Blessed Sacrament School in Hollywood, a Catholic elementary school that is the property of the Archdiocese of Los Angeles. The archdiocese stated that the school's administration did not follow the procedure to get its approval for allowing the filming of the video, which includes drug use. Griffin declined to comment when asked by Fox 11 Los Angeles about the matter.

Critical reception
Lee Su-ho of IZM rated the song 2.5 out of 5 stars. According to him, after two minutes of spitting out meaningless lyrics on a dreamy beat, all that is left is an addictive hook that goes "Gucci gang, Gucci gang, Gucci gang, Gucci gang".

Mitch Findlay of HotNewHipHop rated the song 'hottttt'. According to him, "there are times where Pump shows moments of evolution." However, "Pump seems hampered by his dependence on substances, and while he may enjoy being a recreational drug user, he’ll never find artistic longevity if they remain his sole lyrical focus."

Jacob Shamsian of Insider included the song on his '13 most overhyped songs of 2017' list and said it was "awful".

Year-end lists

Parodies 
The song spawned numerous memes on social media. Saturday Night Live aired a music video for a parody, "Tucci Gang", about actor Stanley Tucci, with cast member Pete Davidson portraying Lil Pump. Eminem mimics the song on his 2018 track, "The Ringer" with a view to dissing Pump himself.

Awards and nominations

Remixes
On December 5, 2017, American rapper Joyner Lucas released the remix of the song onto SoundCloud and has over 71 million views on YouTube. On March 18, 2018, a remix of the song premiered on OVO Sound Radio, featuring Ozuna, French Montana, J Balvin, Bad Bunny, Gucci Mane, Remy Ma, and 21 Savage.

Chart performance 
According to Billboard, "Gucci Gang" is the shortest song to hit the Hot 100's top 10 in 42 years, since Dickie Goodman's "Mr. Jaws" reached #4 on Oct. 11, 1975.

Charts

Weekly charts

Year-end charts

Certifications

References

2017 songs
2017 singles
Lil Pump songs
Warner Records singles
Songs written by Lil Pump
Southern hip hop songs
Trap music songs
Internet memes introduced in 2017